The  is a counter terrorism tactical unit of the Japan Coast Guard, based at the . The acronym of its Kanji name has already been used by other units, the abbreviation "SST" is used for this team.

Background
At the beginning of the establishment there were only 8 members. But due to the airport construction, the unit's manpower was increased to have 24 operators.

In 1990, due to the plutonium transport mission, the number of members was increased to 37 and the equipment was updated. A detachment corp for the escort mission was organized and called , but after the mission ended it joined again with Kaikei-tai. In 1996, it was renamed to its current unit name.

Organization

Structure
Although detailed organization is not disclosed, it is said that under command of the team leader, seven sections consisting of eight operators are organized. Specialists such as EOD and EMT are assigned for each sections.

Recruitment and training
Members at the time of the establishment of Kaikei-tai were mainly scouted from Tokkei-tai. After establishing the structure as SST, it is recruiting personnel from the entire Japan Coast Guard.

Because it was the first counter-terrorism unit for MSA, Kaikei-tai faced considerable difficulties. However basic close quarters combat and marksman techniques were acquired in the GSDF Ranger Course at Fuji School, maritime counter-terrorism operations was an unknown field even for Rangers, so the MSA officers had no choice but to conduct trial and error by themselves about how to apply those techniques in maritime operations. In 1991, Kaikei-tai got an opportunity to invite combat advisers from the United States Navy SEALs under the financial support of the Sasakawa Foundation and with their instructions, its techniques and tactics were improved to international standards.

Equipment
At the beginning, Kaikei-tai used 4-inch model of Smith & Wesson Model 19 revolvers as its main sidearms. In 1987, Howa Type 64 designated marksman rifles and Howa M1500 sniper rifles were added to its equipment. 

In 1988, Heckler & Koch MP5A5/SD6 submachine guns were adopted. American advisers, while admiring the shooting skills of the MSA officers, pointed out that these revolvers were fundamentally lacking in firepower, so pistols were updated to SIG Sauer P228 by 1992, and Howa Type 89 assault rifles were also introduced. And it also has anti-materiel rifles manufactured by the McMillan Firearms.

Operational history
In 1989, Kaikei-tai operatives were involved in storming a Panama-registered vessel after receiving requests via radio for assistance in the East China Sea near Okinawan waters after British officers were attacked by Filipino crewmembers during a riot. All of the arrested crew members were then taken into custody.

In 1992, the Keijou-tai was deployed on board to guard ships carrying nuclear waste from France all the way to Japan, protecting them from any sort of staged attacks from any radical anti-nuclear activist groups.

In 1999, patrol vessel Mizuho was dispatched to East Timor for non-combatant evacuation operation, and at this time, there is information that two sections of SST were on board to ensure the security of port facilities.

The SST has participated in several Proliferation Security Initiative exercises recently in Australia.

The SST was also responsible for apprehending Sea Shepherd protesters in 2008 after they were confronted by crewmembers of the Nisshin Maru.

Notes

References

Books

Articles

See also 
Special Rescue Team
Maritime Security Response Team (MSRT) - counterpart of the United States Coast Guard.

External links
 Unofficial SST information page 

 
Japan Coast Guard
Non-military counterterrorist organizations